Harpalus yinchuanensis is a species of ground beetle in the subfamily Harpalinae. It was described by Huang in 1993.

References

yinchuanensis
Beetles described in 1993